Saint Martin is an island in the northeast Caribbean Sea, approximately  east of Puerto Rico. The  island is divided roughly 60:40 between the French Republic and the Kingdom of the Netherlands, but the Dutch part is more populated than the French part. The division dates to 1648. The northern French part comprises the Collectivity of Saint Martin and is an overseas collectivity of the French Republic. As part of France, the French part of the island is also part of the European Union. The southern Dutch part comprises Sint Maarten and is one of four constituent countries that form the Kingdom of the Netherlands.

On January 1, 2019, the population of the whole island was 73,777 inhabitants, with 41,177 living on the Dutch side and 32,489 on the French side. Note that the figure for the French side is based on censuses that took place after the devastation of Hurricane Irma in September 2017, whereas the figure for the Dutch side is only a post-censal estimate still based on the 2011 census. The first census since Hurricane Irma on the Dutch side of the island is scheduled to take place in October 2022. Population of the island on Jan. 1, 2017, before Hurricane Irma, was 75,869 (40,535 on the Dutch side, 35,334 on the French side).

The island's traditional pre-colonial name is Oualichi which means "the island of women".

Collectively, the two territories are known as "Saint-Martin / Sint Maarten", or sometimes "SXM", the IATA identifier for Princess Juliana International Airport, the island's main airport. St. Martin (the French portion) received the ISO 3166-1 code MF in October 2007. In 2010, the Dutch part had its status changed to that of a country within the Kingdom of the Netherlands and was given the code SX.

Geography

This is the only land border shared by the French Republic and the Kingdom of the Netherlands.

The main cities are Philipsburg on the Dutch side and Marigot on the French side. The Dutch side is more heavily populated. The largest settlement on the entire island is Lower Prince's Quarter, which is on the Dutch side.

The highest hilltop is the Pic Paradis in the centre of a hill chain on the French side. Both sides are hilly with large mountain peaks. This forms a valley where many houses are located. There are no rivers on the island, but there are many dry gullies. Hiking trails give access to the dry forest that covers tops and slopes.

The island is located south of Anguilla and is separated from that British overseas territory by the Anguilla Channel. Saint Martin is northwest of Saint Barthélemy and is separated from that French overseas collectivity by the Saint-Barthélemy Channel.

Neighbouring islands include Saint Barthélemy (French), Anguilla (British), Saba (Dutch), Sint Eustatius "Statia" (Dutch), Saint Kitts and Nevis (independent, formerly British). With the exception of Nevis, all of these islands are easily visible on a clear day from St. Martin.

History

It is commonly believed that Christopher Columbus named the island in honour of Saint Martin of Tours when he encountered it on his second voyage of discovery. However, he actually applied the name to the island now called Nevis when he anchored offshore on November 11, 1493, the feast day of Saint Martin. The confusion of numerous poorly charted small islands in the Leeward Islands meant that this name was accidentally transferred to the island now known as Saint-Martin/Sint Maarten.

At Columbus's time, St. Martin was populated, if at all, by Carib Amerindians. The former Arawaks had been chased by the Caribs coming from the north coast of South America a short time before the arrival of the Spaniards who followed in Columbus's wake. The Arawaks were agricultural people who fashioned pottery and whose social organization was headed by hereditary chieftains who derived their power from personal deities called zemis. The Caribs' territory was not completely conquered until the mid-17th century when most of them perished in the struggle between the French, English (later British), Dutch, Danes and Spanish for control of the West Indies islands around the Caribbean Sea. 

The Dutch first began to use the island's ponds for salt in the 1620s. Then still at war with the Dutch, the Spaniards captured St. Martin in 1633. One year later, they built a fort (now Fort Amsterdam, near Philipsburg) and another artillery battery at Pointe Blanche to assert their claim and control access to Great Bay salt pond. A massive influx of African slaves took place in the 18th century with the development of sugarcane plantations by the French and Dutch. Slavery was abolished in the first half of the 19th century. On some of their territories the British imported Chinese and South Asians to take the place of slaves. Thus, St. Martin and the other islands are populated by a mixture of Amerindian, European, African, Indian, and Asian peoples.

On 23 March 1648, the Kingdom of France and the Dutch Republic agreed to divide the island between their two territories, with the signing of the Treaty of Concordia. Folklore surrounds the history of the once ever-changing border division between St. Martin and Sint Maarten, and a popular story among locals narrates that "to divide the island into two sections, [in 1648] the inhabitants were told to choose two walkers, one chosen by the French-dominated community and the other one by the Dutch-dominated community, who were put back to back in one extreme of the island, making them walk in opposite directions while stuck to the littoral line, and not allowing them to run. The point where they eventually met was set as the other extreme of the island, and the subsequently created line was chosen as the frontier, dividing Saint-Martin from Sint Maarten. Seemingly, the French walker had walked more than his Dutch counterpart (they earned their respective lands 54 km² and 32 km²). The French locals' explanation for this discrepancy is that, as the first man chose wine as his stimulant prior to the race, while the latter chose Jenever (Dutch Gin), the difference between such beverages' lightness was said to be the cause of the territorial differences. The Dutch locals instead accuse the French walker of running."

Politics

There currently is a movement aiming to unite the Dutch and French halves of the island of Saint Martin. A "Unity Flag" for representing this unification was created in 1990.

Currently, the island is divided into Sint Maarten (the southern half of the island, part of the Netherlands) and the Collectivity of Saint Martin (the northern half of the island, part of France). The island has been divided since the signing of the Treaty of Concordia in 1648, which today remains as one of the oldest treaties still in effect. Unification of the island enjoys support from the population of both halves.

The Treaty of Concordia allows freedom of movement between both parts of the island, which has promoted a common sentiment among the island's inhabitants, although this is also the reason why some see a formal unification as unnecessary. Other arguments against unification of the island are that neither France nor the Netherlands would allow it and that both sides would require full independence to achieve it.

On 31 August 1990, the "Unity Flag" of Saint Martin was adopted at the Preliminary Conference on National Symbols at the Philipsburg Jubilee Library, in Sint Maarten. This flag was created to represent the people of both halves of the island and the unification of the latter, and is hoisted today on some houses and sometimes by churches and religious groups in Saint Martin. In August 2020, when restrictions and controls were added to the Saint Martin–Sint Maarten border to contain the COVID-19 pandemic, some protesters against these measures flew this flag with them. In September 2020, these restrictions were lifted, and people from both sides of the island started chanting "One island, one people, one destiny".

Some notable supporters of this movement include Albert Fleming, former leader of the Collectivity of Saint Martin, who in 2014 stated his support for the unification of the island.

Climate
Under the Köppen climate classification, the island has a tropical savanna climate (Aw) with a dry season from January to April and a rainy season from August to December. The precipitation patterns are due to the movement of the Azores High during the year. With the wind direction predominantly from the east or the northeast, northeasterly trades, temperatures remain stable throughout the year and temperatures rarely exceed  or fall below . Thunderstorms can occasionally occur, with 18 days with thunder per year. Precipitation totals are quite variable from year to year, depending on the number of passing tropical cyclones.

Because the island is located along the intertropical convergence zone, it is occasionally threatened by Atlantic hurricane activity in the late summer and early fall.

Hurricane Irma (2017)

On 6 September 2017 the island was hit by Hurricane Irma (Category 5 at landfall), which caused widespread and significant damage, estimated at $3 billion, to buildings and infrastructure. A total of 11 deaths had been reported as of 9 July 2018. France's Minister of the Interior, Gérard Collomb, said on 8 September 2017 that most of the schools were destroyed on the French half of the island. In addition to damage caused by high winds, there were reports of serious flood damage to businesses in the village of Marigot. Looting was also a serious problem. Both France and the Netherlands sent aid as well as additional police and emergency personnel to the island. The Washington Post reported that 95% of the structures on the French side and 75% of the structures on the Dutch side were damaged or destroyed.

Some days after the storm had abated, a survey by the Dutch Red Cross estimated that nearly a third of the buildings in Sint Maarten had been destroyed and that over 90 per cent of structures on the island had been damaged. Princess Juliana Airport was extensively damaged but reopened on a partial basis in two days to allow incoming relief flights and for flights that would take evacuees to other islands.

Economy

INSEE estimated that the nominal GDP of the French side of Saint Martin amounted to 582 million euros in 2014 (US$772 million at 2014 exchanges rates; US$660 million at Feb. 2022 exchange rates) The nominal GDP of the Dutch side of the island, Sint Maarten, was estimated at 2,229 million Antillean guilders (US$1,245 million at the official peg) in 2014. The nominal GDP of the entire island was thus US$2.01 billion in 2014.

The nominal GDP per capita of the entire island stood at US$27,923 in 2014.

The Dutch side of the island experienced a big recession in 2017 and 2018 due to the devastation of Hurricane Irma which struck the island in September 2017. Real GDP experienced a negative growth of -5.8% in 2017 and -6.6% in 2018 (GDP figures after 2018 have not been published yet). GDP of the French side of the island has not been estimated since 2014.

The main industry of the island is tourism. In 2000, the island had about one million visitors annually. About 85% of the workforce was engaged in the tourist industry.

Demographics
On January 1, 2019, the population of the whole island was 73,777 inhabitants, with 41,177 living on the Dutch side and 32,489 on the French side. Note that the figure for the French side is based on censuses that took place after the devastation of Hurricane Irma in September 2017, whereas the figure for the Dutch side is only a post-censal estimate still based on the 2011 census. The first census since Hurricane Irma on the Dutch side of the island is scheduled to take place in October 2022. Population of the island on Jan. 1, 2017, before Hurricane Irma, was 75,869 (40,535 on the Dutch side, 35,334 on the French side).

Due to a major influx of immigrants searching for better employment and living conditions over the past thirty years, the number of Creoles has been surpassed by the number of immigrants. The island's population is highly diverse, containing people from more than 70  countries.

With so many nationalities present, quite a few languages are spoken. An English-based creole is the main local vernacular. However, the official languages are French for Saint-Martin, with Dutch and English being official for Sint Maarten. Other common languages include various French creoles (spoken by French Caribbean immigrants), Spanish (spoken by immigrants from the Dominican Republic, Puerto Rico, and various South American countries), and Papiamento (spoken by immigrants from Aruba, Bonaire and Curaçao).

Culture

The island's culture is a blend of its African, French, British, Dutch, Amerindian, and Asian heritage. Although each side's culture is influenced by their respective administering countries, they share enough similar heritage and traditions that it can be difficult to tell where Saint-Martin ends and Sint Maarten begins.

The Creole population can trace most of their roots to Africa, France, the Netherlands and the British Isles. Only some stones remain from the ruins of the two forts built by the Spanish occupation in its early takeover. But during the colonial period, the British settlers and several military dominations left their idiom as the main language spoken on the island, and have made a large impact on St.  Martin's culture.

In French Saint-Martin, the most practised religion is Roman Catholicism. Dutch Sint Maarten favors Protestant denominations, particularly Methodism. The island also has small Jewish, Seventh-day Adventist, Hindu,   Muslim, Sikh, Buddhist, and Rastafari communities.

The whole island is known for its excellent cuisine. Creole, French, and West Indian cooking are particularly renowned.

Popular music on St. Martin includes a variety of styles found throughout the Caribbean. Calypso, merengue, soca, zouk, reggae, and chutney all contribute to the festive culture.

St. Martin's Dutch side is known for its festive nightlife, beaches, jewellery, drinks made with native rum-based guavaberry liquors, and casinos. The island's French side is known for its nude beaches, clothes, shopping (including outdoor markets), and French and Indian Caribbean cuisine. English is the most commonly spoken language along with a local dialect. The official languages are French for Saint-Martin, and both Dutch and English for Sint Maarten. Other common languages include various French-based creoles (spoken by immigrants from other French Caribbean islands), Spanish (spoken by immigrants from the Dominican Republic and various South American countries), and Papiamento (spoken by immigrants from Aruba, Bonaire and Curaçao).

Among the leading cultural artists of the island are Youth Waves, music band; Isidore "Mighty Dow" York, kaisonian, penman; Roland Richardson, Impressionist painter; Ruby Bute, painter; Nicole de Weever, dancer and Broadway star; Lasana M. Sekou, poet, author, independence advocate; Clara Reyes, choreographer; and Tanny and The Boys, string band music group.

News publications on St. Martin include The Daily Herald, Soualiga News Day, Soualiga News, St. Maarten News, SMN News, SXM Island Time, and SXM Talks.

Currency
The official currency of Saint Martin is the Euro, while Sint Maarten uses the Netherlands Antillean guilder, pegged at 1.79 per US dollar. As a consequence of the dissolution of the Netherlands Antilles, the Netherlands Antillean guilder will cease to be legal tender and be replaced by the Caribbean guilder, which was scheduled for circulation in the first half of 2021, but now scheduled for 2024. Almost every store on the island also accepts the United States dollar, although sometimes a more expensive exchange rate is used.

Transport
Public buses are the primary mode of transportation for visitors staying on the island.

Border checks
Neither side of the island is part of the Schengen Area; full border checks are performed when travelling in and out of the island. Passport controls are also exercised when taking the ferry from Marigot or Princess Juliana International Airport to Anguilla. There are rarely checks at the border between the two sides of the island.

In 1994, the Kingdom of the Netherlands and France signed the Franco-Dutch treaty on Saint Martin border controls, which allows for joint Franco-Dutch border controls on so-called "risk flights" arriving from off-island and only admitting foreigners having permission to travel on both sides of the island. After some delay, the treaty was ratified in November 2006 in the Netherlands and subsequently entered into force on 1 August 2007. Its provisions are not yet implemented as the working group specified in the treaty is not yet installed. The treaty requires a working group that has never been set up, to harmonize external checks at the two main airports. The Dutch side has expressed concern that new and tighter French visa requirements would harm their tourism income.

Airports

The island is served by many major airlines that daily bring in large jet aircraft, including Boeing 747s and Airbus A340s carrying tourists from across the world. The short main runway at Princess Juliana International Airport and its position between a large hill and a beach cause some spectacular approaches. Aviation photographers flock to the airport to capture pictures of large jets just a few metres above sunbathers on Maho Beach.

There is a small airport on the French side of the island at Grand Case, L'Espérance Airport for small aircraft serving neighbouring Caribbean islands. It frequently suffers thick fog during the hurricane season due to its location.

See also

Caribbean Netherlands
List of Sint Maarten leaders of government
Outline of Saint Martin
Overseas France
Scouting and Guiding in Guadeloupe and Saint Martin

References

Sources

Further reading
 Arrindell, Rhoda, Language, Culture, and Identity in St. Martin. St. Martin: House of Nehesi Publishers, 2014.
 St. Martin Massive! A Snapshot of Popular Artists, St. Martin: House of Nehesi Publishers, 2000.
 Hyman, Yvette, From Yvette's Kitchen To Your Table: A Treasury of St. Martin's Traditional & Contemporary Cuisine. St. Martin: House of Nehesi Publishers, 2014 (Fourth printing).
 Lake Jr., Joseph H., Friendly Anger – The rise of the labour movement in St. Martin. St. Martin: House of Nehesi Publishers, 2004.
 Sekou, Lasana M. (ed.), National Symbols of St. Martin – A Primer. St. Martin: House of Nehesi Publishers, 1997 (Third printing).

External links

 General information
Saint Martin. The World Factbook. Central Intelligence Agency.

 News and media
 The Daily Herald daily newspaper from St. Maarten
 LE FAXinfo daily newspaper from Saint Martin (in French)

 Travel

 Dutch St. Maarten official Tourist Bureau
 French Saint Martin official Tourist Office
 Official tourist website for LGBT visitors
 French Saint Martin Hotel Association
 Princess Juliana International Airport, Sint Maarten official website
 

 Others
 Eric Dubois-Millot, Birds of Sint Maarten, Action Nature

 
 Leeward Islands (Caribbean)
International islands
Nude beaches